Kamińsk  is a village in the administrative district of Gmina Górowo Iławeckie, within Bartoszyce County, Warmian-Masurian Voivodeship, in northern Poland, close to the border with the Kaliningrad Oblast of Russia.

The village has a population of 1,000.

During World War II, it was the location of the southern section of the German prisoner-of-war camp Stalag I-A, which initially held Polish POWs, and later also other Allied POWs.

References

Villages in Bartoszyce County